The Roman Catholic Diocese of Zamość-Lubaczów is a suffragan Latin diocese in the Ecclesiastical province of Przemyśl in Poland.

Its cathedral episcopal see is Katedra Zmartwychwstania Pańskiego i św. Tomasza Apostoła, a  World Heritage Site dedicated to Resurrection and the St. Thomas the Apostle, in the city of Zamość, Lubelskie. It also has 
 a Co-cathedral: Konkatedra św. Stanisława, dedicated to Saint Stanislaus, in Lubaczów, Podkarpackie
 a Minor Basilica: Bazylika św. Antoniego z Padwy, in Radecznica, Lubelskie
 a second World Heritage Site: Cerkiew św.  Paraskewy, in Radruż, Podkarpackie.

History 
 1991: Established as Apostolic Administration of Lubaczów, on territory split off from the Metropolitan Archdiocese of Lviv (in Ukraine)
 Promoted on 25 March 1992 as Diocese of Zamość – Lubaczów, having gained territory from the Diocese of Lublin
 Enjoyed Papal visits from the Polish Pope John Paul II in June 1991 and June 1999.

Statistics 
As per 2014, it pastorally served 462,586 Catholics (94.9% of 487,500 total) on 8,144 km² in 185 parishes and 4 missions with 478 priests (451 diocesan, 27 religious), 173 lay religious (27 brothers, 146 sisters) and 45 seminarians.

Episcopal ordinaries
(all Roman rite)

Suffragan Bishops of Zamość-Lubaczów 
 Jan Śrutwa (25 March 1992 – retired 5 August 2006); previously Titular Bishop of Liberalia (1984.07.25 – 1992.03.25) as Auxiliary Bishop of Diocese of Lublin (Poland) (1984.07.25 – 1992.03.25)
 Wacław Depo (5 August 2006 – 29 December 2011), next Metropolitan Archbishop of Częstochowa (Poland) (2011.12.29 – ...)
 Marian Rojek (30 June 2012 – ... ), previously Titular Bishop of Tisedi (2005.12.21 – 2012.06.30) as Auxiliary Bishop of Archdiocese of Przemyśl (Poland) (2005.12.21 – 2012.06.30).

See also 
 List of Catholic dioceses in Poland
 Roman Catholicism in Poland

Sources and external links 
 GCatholic.org - data for all sections
 Catholic Hierarchy
 Diocese website

Roman Catholic dioceses in Poland
Roman Catholic dioceses established in 1991
1991 establishments in Poland